The vampire squid (Vampyroteuthis infernalis, lit. 'vampire squid from hell') is a small cephalopod found throughout temperate and tropical oceans in extreme deep sea conditions. The vampire squid uses its bioluminescent organs and its unique oxygen metabolism to thrive in the parts of the ocean with the lowest concentrations of oxygen. It has two long retractile filaments, located between the first two pairs of arms on its dorsal side, which distinguish it from both octopuses and squids, and places it in its own order, Vampyromorphida, although its closest relatives are octopods. As a phylogenetic relict, it is the only known surviving member of its order.

The first specimens were collected on the Valdivia Expedition and were originally described as an octopus in 1903 by German teuthologist Carl Chun, but later assigned to a new order together with several extinct taxa.

Discovery 
The vampire squid was discovered during the Valdivia Expedition (1898–1899), led by Carl Chun. Chun was a zoologist who was inspired by the Challenger Expedition, and wanted to verify that life does indeed exist below 300 fathoms (550 meters). Chun later classified the vampire squid into its family, Vampyroteuthidae. This expedition was funded by the German society Gesellschaft Deutscher Naturforscher und Ärzte, a group of German scientists who believed there was life at depths greater than 550 meters, contrary to the Abyssus theory. The S.S. Valdivia was fitted with equipment for the collection of deep-sea organisms, as well as laboratories and specimen jars, in order to analyze and preserve what was caught. The voyage began in Hamburg, Germany, followed by Edinburgh, and then traced around the west coast of Africa. After navigating around the southern point of Africa, the expedition studied deep areas of the Indian and Antarctic Ocean.

Description 
Its  gelatinous body varies in colour from velvety jet-black to pale reddish, depending on location and lighting conditions. A webbing of skin connects its eight arms, each lined with rows of fleshy spines or cirri; the inner side of this "cloak" is black. Only the distal halves (farthest from the body) of the arms have suckers. The name of the animal was inspired by its dark colour, and cloaklike webbing, rather than habit—it feeds on detritus, not blood.

Mature adults have a pair of small fins projecting from the lateral sides of the mantle. These earlike fins serve as the adult's primary means of propulsion: vampire squid move through the water by flapping their fins. Their beaklike jaws are white. Within the webbing are two pouches wherein the tactile velar filaments are concealed. The filaments are analogous to a true squid's tentacles, extending well past the arms; but differ in origin, and represent the pair that was lost by the ancestral octopus.

The vampire squid is almost entirely covered in light-producing organs called photophores, capable of producing disorienting flashes of light ranging in duration from fractions of a second to several minutes. The intensity and size of the photophores can also be modulated. Appearing as small, white discs, the photophores are larger and more complex at the tips of the arms and at the base of the two fins, but are absent from the undersides of the caped arms. Two larger, white areas on top of the head were initially believed to also be photophores, but are now identified as photoreceptors.

The chromatophores (pigment organs) common to most cephalopods are poorly developed in the vampire squid. The animal is, therefore, incapable of changing its skin colour in the dramatic fashion of shallow-dwelling cephalopods, though such ability would not be useful at the lightless depths where it lives.

Habitat and adaptations 
Within this region of the world's oceans is a discrete habitat known as the oxygen minimum zone (OMZ). Within the zone, the saturation of oxygen is too low to support aerobic metabolism in most complex organisms. The vampire squid is the only cephalopod able to live its entire life cycle in the minimum zone, at oxygen saturations as low as 3%.

The vampire squid's worldwide range is confined to the tropics and subtropics.

To cope with life in the suffocating depths, vampire squids have developed several adaptations: Of all deep-sea cephalopods, their mass-specific metabolic rate is the lowest. Their blue blood's hemocyanin binds and transports oxygen more efficiently than in other cephalopods, aided by gills with an especially large surface area. The animals have weak musculature, but maintain agility and buoyancy with little effort because of sophisticated statocysts (balancing organs akin to a human's inner ear) and ammonium-rich gelatinous tissues closely matching the density of the surrounding seawater. The vampire squid's ability to thrive in OMZs also keeps it safe from apex predators that require a large amount of oxygen to live.

The vampire squid possesses large eyes and optic lobes which may be an adaptation to increase sensitivity for long-ranging detection of bioluminescence and monitoring a huge water volume where density of prey and mates is low.

Like many deep-sea cephalopods, the vampire squid lacks ink sacs. If disturbed, it will curl its arms up outwards and wrap them around its body, turning itself inside-out in a way, exposing spiny projections. If highly agitated, it may eject a sticky cloud of bioluminescent mucus containing innumerable orbs of blue light from the arm tips. This luminous barrage, which may last nearly 10 minutes, would presumably serve to dazzle would-be predators and allow the vampire squid to disappear into the blackness without the need to swim far. The glowing ink is also able to stick to the predator, creating what is called a burglar alarm (making the vampire squid's predator more visible to secondary predators). The display is made only if the animal is very agitated, because regenerating the mucus is metabolically costly. The vampire squid also has bioluminescent organs at the end of each of its arms, using them as a lure to attract prey. The ends of squid's arms are also regenerative, so if they are bitten off, they can be used as a  diversion allowing the animal to escape while its predator is distracted.

Development and reproduction 

Few specifics are known regarding the ontogeny of the vampire squid. Their development progresses through three morphologic forms: the very young animals have a single pair of fins, an intermediate form has two pairs, and the mature form again has one. At their earliest and intermediate phases of development, a pair of fins is located near the eyes; as the animal develops, this pair gradually disappears as the other pair develops. As the animals grow and their surface area to volume ratio drops, the fins are resized and repositioned to maximize gait efficiency. Whereas the young propel themselves primarily by jet propulsion, mature adults find flapping their fins to be the most efficient means. This unique ontogeny caused confusion in the past, with the varying forms identified as several species in distinct families.

If hypotheses may be drawn from knowledge of other deep-sea cephalopods, the vampire squid likely reproduces slowly by way of a small number of large eggs. Ovulation is irregular and there is minimal energy devotion into the development of the gonad. Growth is slow, as nutrients are not abundant at depths frequented by the animals. The vastness of their habitat and its sparse population make procreative encounters a fortuitous event. The female may store a male's hydraulically implanted spermatophore (a tapered, cylindrical satchel of sperm) for long periods before she is ready to fertilize her eggs. Once she does, she may need to brood over them for up to 400 days before they hatch. Their reproductive strategy appears to be iteroparous, which is an exception amongst the otherwise semelparous Coleoidea. During their life, Coleidea cephalopods are thought to go through only one reproductive cycle whereas vampire squid have shown evidence of multiple reproductive cycles. After releasing their eggs, new batches of eggs are formed after the female vampire squid returns to resting. This process may repeat up to, and sometimes more than, twenty times. It has been hypothesized that the iteroparous lifestyle of the vampire squid has evolved with the squid's relaxed lifestyle. With iteroparity often seen in organisms with high adult survival rates, such as the vampire squid, many low-cost reproductive cycles would be expected for the species.

Hatchlings are about 8 mm in length and are well-developed miniatures of the adults, with some differences. Their arms lack webbing, their eyes are smaller, and their velar filaments are not fully formed. The hatchlings are transparent and survive on a generous internal yolk for an unknown period before they begin to actively feed. The smaller animals frequent much deeper waters, perhaps feeding on marine snow (falling organic detritus). The mature vampire squid is also thought to be an opportunistic hunter of larger prey as fish bones, other squid flesh, and gelatinous matter has been recorded in mature vampire squid stomachs.

Reproduction of the vampire squid is unlike any other coleoid cephalopod. During mating the males pass a “packet” of sperm to a female and the female accepts it and stores it in a special pouch inside her mantle. When the female is ready, she will use the packet to reproduce. The females spawn eggs in separate spawning “events” when she feels the necessity to reproduce. These spawning events happen quite far apart due to the vampire squid's low metabolic rate, meaning they take a long time to accumulate the necessary resources to spawn. This is very rare and needs further research done on it.

Behavior 

What behavioral data is known has been gleaned from ephemeral encounters with ROVs; animals are often injured during capture, and survive up to two months in aquaria, although it is hypothesized that they can live for over eight years. An artificial environment makes reliable observation of non-defensive behavior difficult. In May 2014, Monterey Bay Aquarium (California, United States) became the first to ever put this species on display.

With their long velar filaments deployed, vampire squids have been observed drifting along in the deep, black ocean currents. If the filaments contact an entity, or if vibrations impinge upon them, the animals investigate with rapid acrobatic movements. They are capable of swimming at speeds equivalent to two body lengths per second, with an acceleration time of five seconds. However, their weak muscles limit stamina considerably.

Unlike their relatives living in more hospitable climates, deep-sea cephalopods cannot afford to expend energy in protracted flight. Given their low metabolic rate and the low density of prey at such depths, vampire squids must use innovative predator avoidance tactics to conserve energy. Their aforementioned bioluminescent "fireworks" are combined with the writhing of glowing arms, erratic movements, and escape trajectories, making it difficult for a predator to identify multiple targets. The vampire squid's retractile filaments have been suggested to play a larger role in predator avoidance via both detection and escape mechanisms.

In a threat response called the "pumpkin" or "pineapple" posture, the vampire squid inverts its caped arms back over the body, presenting an ostensibly larger form covered in fearsome-looking though harmless spines (called cirri). The underside of the cape is heavily pigmented, masking most of the body's photophores. The glowing arm tips are clustered together far above the animal's head, diverting attack away from critical areas. If a predator were to bite off an arm tip, the vampire squid can regenerate it.

Feeding 
They have eight arms but lack feeding tentacles, and instead use two retractile filaments in order to capture food. These filaments have small hairs on them that are made up of many sensory cells that helps them detect and secure their prey. They combine waste with mucus secreted from suckers to form balls of food. As sedentary generalists, they feed on detritus, including the remains of gelatinous zooplankton (such as salps, larvaceans, and medusae jellies) and complete copepods, ostracods, amphipods, and isopods, as well as faecal pellets of other aquatic organisms that live above. Vampire squids also use a unique luring method where they purposefully agitate bioluminescent protists in the water as a way to attract larger prey for them to consume.

Vampire squids have been found among the stomach contents of large, deepwater fish, including giant grenadiers, and deep-diving mammals, such as whales and sea lions.

Relationships 

The Vampyromorphida is the extant sister taxon to all octopuses. Phylogenetic studies of cephalopods using multiple genes and mitochondrial genomes have shown that the Vampyromorphida are the first group of Octopodiformes to evolutionarily diverge from all others. The Vampyromorphida is characterized by derived characters such as the possession of photophores and of two velar filaments which are most probably modified arms. It also shares the inclusion of an internal gladius with other coleoids, including squid, and eight webbed arms with cirrate octopods.

Vampyroteuthis shares its eight cirrate arms with the Cirrata, in which lateral cirri, or filaments, alternate with the suckers. Vampyroteuthis differs in that suckers are present only on the distal half of the arms while cirri run the entire length. In cirrate octopods suckers and cirri run and alternate on the entire length. Also, a close relationship between Vampyroteuthis and the Jurassic-Cretaceous Loligosepiina is indicated by the similarity of their gladii, the internal stiffening structure. Vampyronassa rhodanica from the middle Jurassic La Voulte-sur-Rhône of France is considered as one of a vampyroteuthid that shares some characters with Vampyroteuthis.

The supposed vampyromorphids from the Kimmeridgian-Tithonian (156–146 mya) of Solnhofen, Plesioteuthis prisca, Leptoteuthis gigas, and Trachyteuthis hastiformis, cannot be positively assigned to this group; they are large species (from 35 cm in P. prisca to > 1 m in L. gigas) and show features not found in vampyromorphids, being somewhat similar to the true squids, Teuthida.

Conservation status 
The vampire squid is currently not on any endangered or threatened species list and they have no known impact on humans.

Popular culture 
Following an article in Rolling Stone magazine by Matt Taibbi after the subprime mortgage crisis of 2008, the term "vampire squid" has been regularly used in popular culture to refer to Goldman Sachs, the American investment bank.

Real vampire squids are shown in the "Ocean Deep" episode of Planet Earth.

Notes

References 

  (Version of 5/6/03, retrieved 2006-DEC-06.)
 
  (French with English abstract)
 
 
 
 
 
 
  (HTML abstract)

External links 

Tree of Life: Vampyroteuthis infernalis.
National Geographic video of a vampire squid
Monterey Bay Aquarium Research Institute (MBARI): What the vampire squid really eats.
Vampire squid

Images 
The vampire squid's photophores and photoreceptors
Diagram and images of a Vampyroteuthis hatchling
Photomicrograph of arm tip fluorescence

Squid
Molluscs described in 1903
Bioluminescent molluscs
Taxa named by Carl Chun